Bryan E. Petersen (born April 9, 1986) is a former professional baseball outfielder. He played in Major League Baseball for the Miami Marlins from 2010 to 2012.

Early life
Petersen was born in Agoura, California and graduated from Chatsworth High School in Chatsworth, California. He played college baseball at the University of California, Irvine.

Professional career

Florida/Miami Marlins
Petersen was drafted by the Florida Marlins in the seventh round of the 2007 Major League Baseball draft out of the University of California, Irvine.

Petersen was called up to the majors for the first time on May 6, 2010. He hit a single in his first career at bat and eventually scored a run.

On July 20, 2011, Peterson pitched a hitless inning of relief, walking one batter, in a game against the San Diego Padres. On September 27, when Javier Vázquez made what could be his last Major League start, Petersen gave him a win when he hit a ninth inning walk-off home run off Nationals reliever Doug Slaten off the Bud Light advertisement in right field.

On April 29, 2012, Petersen was recalled from Triple-A New Orleans to replace struggling outfielder Chris Coghlan, who was optioned to New Orleans. Petersen was hitting .320 with 8 runs batted in and 3 SB in 21 games at New Orleans. He finished the season batting .195 in 241 at-bats with no homers, 9 doubles, 3 triples, 17 runs batted in, 25 walks, and 8 stolen bases.

After the signing of reliever Jon Rauch to a one-year deal, the Marlins designated Petersen for assignment. He was resigned afterwards and sent to New Orleans. In 2013, he hit .275, with 33 doubles, 5 triples, 8 home runs, and 49 runs batted in while stealing 12 bases with the Zephyrs.

Texas Rangers
Petersen signed a minor league deal with the Texas Rangers on December 5, 2013. He currently plays for the Texas Rangers' Triple-A affiliate, the Round Rock Express. On 3 April 2014, he hit a grand slam in a 7-6 loss to the Oklahoma City RedHawks. So far, in the 2014 season, he has hit .254, with 12 homers, 57 runs batted in, and 5 stolen bases to go with a .323 on base percentage.

Milwaukee Brewers
On December 16, 2014, he signed a minor league contract with the Milwaukee Brewers. He was released on August 1, 2015.

References

External links

Baseball Almanac

1986 births
Living people
Sportspeople from Los Angeles County, California
Baseball players from California
Florida Marlins players
Miami Marlins players
UC Irvine Anteaters baseball players
Jamestown Jammers players
Greensboro Grasshoppers players
Jupiter Hammerheads players
Carolina Mudcats players
Jacksonville Suns players
New Orleans Zephyrs players
Round Rock Express players
Mesa Solar Sox players
Venados de Mazatlán players
American expatriate baseball players in Mexico
Colorado Springs Sky Sox players
Anchorage Bucs players
Chatsworth High School alumni